Katherine Warburton "Kay" Sutton (June 14, 1915 – March 1, 1988) was an American actress.

Personal life
Sutton was married four times, Frederick Moulton Alger, Dan Topping (his fourth marriage), Clifton Stokes Weaver and Edward Cronjager.

Partial filmography

 Roberta (1935) - Fashion Model (uncredited)
 Reckless (1935) - Woman with Paul in Audience (uncredited)
 Old Man Rhythm (1935) - College Girl (uncredited)
 Follow the Fleet (1936) - Telephone Operator (uncredited)
 A Star Is Born (1937) - (uncredited)
 Night Spot (1938) - Allan's Wife (uncredited)
 This Marriage Business (1938) - Bella Lawson
 Vivacious Lady (1938) - Woman Exiting Train at Old Sharon (uncredited)
 The Saint in New York (1938) - Fay Edwards
 Having Wonderful Time (1938) - Camp Guest (uncredited)
 I'm From the City (1938) - Marlene Martindale
 Smashing the Rackets (1938) - Peggy
 Carefree (1938) - Miss Adams
 The Mad Miss Manton (1938) - Gloria Hamilton
 Lawless Valley (1938) - Norma Rogers
 Beauty for the Asking (1939) - Miss Whitman
 Twelve Crowded Hours (1939) - Miss Martin (uncredited)
 The Story of Vernon and Irene Castle (1939) - Girl with Stockbrokers (uncredited)
 S.O.S. Tidal Wave (1939) - Laurel Shannon
 Call a Messenger (1939) - Virginia Phillips (uncredited)
 Man from Montreal (1939) - Myrna Montgomery aka Mrs. Myrna Rawlins
 Balalaika (1939) - Girl at the Balalaika (uncredited)
 The Man Who Talked Too Much (1940) - Mrs. Knight (scenes deleted)
 Laughing at Danger (1940) - Mrs. Inez Morton
 Sky Murder (1940) - Texas O'Keefe (uncredited)
 Li'l Abner (1940) - Wendy Wilecat
 The Bank Dick (1940) - Young Woman on Bench (uncredited)
 A Night at Earl Carroll's (1940) - Girl Attendant (uncredited)
 Maisie Was a Lady (1941) - House Guest (uncredited)
 You're Out of Luck (1941) - Marjorie Overton
 The Trial of Mary Dugan (1941) - Secretary (uncredited)
 Sunny (1941) - Brunette (uncredited)
 Sergeant York (1941) - Saloon Girl (uncredited)
 Flying Blind (1941) - Miss Danila

References

External links

 

1915 births
1988 deaths
American film actresses
20th-century American actresses
People from Irvington, New Jersey
Burials at Elmwood Cemetery (Detroit)